Slocum Independent School District is a public school district based in the community of Slocum in unincorporated Anderson County, Texas (USA).

Located in southeastern Anderson County, the district has two campuses:

Slocum High School (Grades 9-12)
Slocum Elementary School and Junior High (Grades EE-8)

In 2009, the school district was rated "recognized" by the Texas Education Agency.

References

External links

School districts in Anderson County, Texas